Edward Baber may refer to:

Edward Baber (MP) (1532–1578), British MP
Edward Ambrose Baber (1793–1846), American doctor and diplomat
Edward Colborne Baber (1843–1890), English orientalist